David Robertson (born 4 March 1959) is an Australian cricketer. He played in four first-class matches for South Australia in 1986/87.

See also
 List of South Australian representative cricketers

References

External links
 

1959 births
Living people
Australian cricketers
South Australia cricketers
Cricketers from Adelaide